Karl Spain (born 20 October 1971) is an Irish comedian from Limerick. He is from the Corbally area of the city and was educated at CBS Sexton Street.

In 2000, Spain won the RTÉ award for Best New Act.

Spain appeared at the Montreal Just for Laughs comedy festival in 2003, which was later repeated on RTÉ Television. He is a regular at the Kilkenny Cat Laughs comedy festival.

Spain later ran a series on RTÉ entitled Karl Spain Wants a Woman.  He appeared as master of kung-fu on the fifth series of Killinaskully in October 2008.

In 2009 he had yet another TV show on RTÉ Two, Karl Spain wants to Rock.

In March 2010 Karl began a tour as supporting act to fellow Irish comedian, Ed Byrne.

Toured with Kevin Bridges in 2015.

Karl Spain  has also been known to attend University of Limerick Comedy Nights.

References

External links

Karl Spain on Irish Comedy
Karl Spain at ComedyCV
Killinascully (T.V Show) at RTÉ
Podge & Rodge's Stickit Inn (T.V Show)  at RTÉ

The Panel (T.V Show)
The Podge & Rodge Show at RTÉ
Tubridy Tonight (T.V Show)  at RTÉ
The Afternoon Show (T.V Show) at RTÉ
Republic of Telly (T.V Show) at RTÉ

1971 births
Living people
Irish male comedians
RTÉ Television people
Mass media people from Limerick (city)